The 2000 Washington gubernatorial election was held on November 7, 2000. Incumbent Democratic governor Gary Locke defeated the Republican candidate John Carlson for his second term in a landslide.

, this was the earliest gubernatorial election in Washington in which both candidates are currently still living. This would also be the last gubernatorial election in Washington in which the margin of victory was in double digits and in which any counties in Eastern Washington voted for a Democrat until Jay Inslee's 2020 landslide victory.

Primary election

Candidates

Democratic 
 Gary Locke, incumbent Governor of Washington
 Meta Heller

Republican 
 John Carlson, talk radio host on KVI-AM
 Harold Hochstatter, state senator

Libertarian 
 Steve W. LePage

Results

General election

Candidates 
 Gary Locke (D), incumbent Governor of Washington
 John Carlson (R), talk radio host on KVI-AM

Debates 
Complete video of debate, September 28, 2000 - C-SPAN
Complete video of debate, October 11, 2000 - C-SPAN
Complete video of debate, October 23, 2000 - C-SPAN

Results

References

2000
2000 United States gubernatorial elections
Gubernatorial